The Taddei Tondo or The Virgin and Child with the Infant St John is a marble relief tondo (circular composition) of the Madonna and Child and the infant Saint John the Baptist, by the Italian Renaissance artist Michelangelo Buonarroti. It is in the permanent collection of the Royal Academy of Arts in London, it is the only marble sculpture by Michelangelo in Great Britain. A "perfect demonstration" of his carving technique, the work delivers a "powerful emotional and narrative punch".

Physical history
The tondo dates to Michelangelo's time in Florence before his move to Rome in 1505. According to Vasari, while working on his David, "also at this time he blocked out but did not finish two marble tondi, one for Taddeo Taddei, today in his house, and for Bartolomeo Pitti he began another... which works were considered outstanding and marvellous".

To the lower right of the back of the relief is a ligature combining the letters L and A, probably the mark of another carver or dealer, and most likely the initials of Lapo d'Antonio di Lapo, active at the Opera del Duomo and for a short period in 1506/7 one of Michelangelo's assistants. A chisel blow on the reverse seemingly from this earlier phase resulted in a hairline crack in the face of the Virgin that may only have become apparent as carving progressed. It is uncertain whether Michelangelo, known for his concern for his materials, was constrained by a shortage of ready alternatives or more accepting of flaws and confident in his ability to work round them after his success with the damaged block for David. The missing segment to the bottom right may be a result of an excess of his celebrated "direct attack", while the five holes in the outer rim are variously dated and were intended for fixings.

In 1568 the tondo was still in the Palazzo Taddei, but by 1678 the family had moved to a new address near San Remigio. At an unknown date the tondo was taken to Rome, where it was acquired from Jean-Baptiste Wicar by Sir George Beaumont in 1822. Initially hung at Beaumont's house in Grosvenor Square, it was bequeathed to the Academy in 1830 and installed at Somerset House, before moving with the Academy to the east wing of the new National Gallery building in 1836, where it remained until the Academy relocated to Burlington House in 1868. It has been housed and displayed in various locations there ever since, except for an exhibition at the Victoria and Albert Museum in 1960. The discovery of the hairline crack running through the upper half of the marble contributed to the decision in 1989 to provide a permanent home for the tondo. Subsequently the tondo was cleaned with dichloromethane swabs and clay poultices to remove residues of nineteenth-century plaster casts and their oil-based release agents, packing materials, traces of beeswax and pine resin adhesives, and other surface accretions. The tondo was left unwaxed and no other coating applied, as the work is not "finished" and was not originally polished. Since the opening of the Sackler Wing of Galleries in 1991, the tondo has been on free public display in a purpose-built area on the top floor, positioned for reasons of preventive conservation behind protective glass, to combat the effects of air pollution and the possibility of vandalism.

Description
The tondo as a format for painting and relief sculpture was a quintessential product of the Florentine Renaissance. For a century from around 1430 all the leading artists, including Filippo Lippi, Botticelli, Luca Signorelli, Piero di Cosimo, Fra Bartolomeo, Andrea del Sarto, Leonardo da Vinci (in a lost work), and Raphael, painted tondi. In the same few years that Michelangelo executed his only panel painting documented in contemporary sources, the Doni tondo, he sculpted the Pitti and Taddei tondi - but he did not return to the form.

The tondo depicts a seated Virgin Mary with the baby Jesus dynamically sprawled across her lap, turning and looking back over his right shoulder towards the infant Saint John the Baptist, who stands before him looking down and holding a fluttering bird. Compositionally, the eye of the viewer is drawn diagonally along Christ's body, back up that of his mother, with her gaze across to John, and from his face back to Christ. John, patron saint of Florence, with his attribute of a baptismal bowl, crosses his arms, perhaps in allusion to the cross. Most likely it is a goldfinch not a dove that he holds - Christian symbolism sees in this bird a representation of the Passion - the piece of marble below might then have been intended as a crown of thorns. 

Executed with only a point and claw chisel, often driven hard and with great energy, the combination helps create a sense of "surface unity" unbroken by the use of the drill. The Christ child in full relief is highly finished, the shallower relief of the Virgin finished to a lesser degree, St. John more so again, while the background is roughly executed. These marked variations in texture help establish the relative status of the three figures while creating a sense of compositional depth all the greater for not being more conventionally "finished".

Many of Michelangelo's works are unfinished. According to nineteenth-century French sculptor and critic Eugène Guillaume, Michelangelo's "non finito" was "one of the master's expressive devices in his quest for infinite suggestiveness".

Reception and influence
Taddeo Taddei was patron and friend of Raphael, who studied and reworked the tondo in two drawings, the versi of The Storming of Perugia in the Louvre and of compositional studies for the Madonna del Prato at Chatsworth House. Raphael returned to the twisting body of the Christ child stretching across his mother's lap in the Bridgewater Madonna.
Shortly after its arrival in England, the tondo was sketched by Wilkie, who wrote to Beaumont "your important acquisition of the basso-relievo of Michael Angelo is still the chief talk of all our artists. It is indeed a great addition to our stock of art, and is the only work that has appeared in this northern latitude to justify the great reputation of its author". Cockerell noted in his diary how "the subject seems growing from the marble & emerging into life. It assumes by degrees its shape, features from an unformed mass, as it were you trace & watch its birth from the sculptor's mind". Shortly after its arrival at the Royal Academy, the tondo was sketched by Constable, who published a letter in the Athenaeum of 3 July 1830 praising the way it was lit, "showing the more finished parts to advantage, and causing those less perfect to become masses of shadow, having at a distance all the effect of a rich picture in chiaroscuro". With its differing degrees of finish the tondo is an outstanding technical study piece; plaster casts may be found at the Victoria and Albert Museum and Fitzwilliam Museum.

Gallery

See also
List of works by Michelangelo
 Pitti Tondo
 Doni Tondo

Notes

References

External links
 Taddei Tondo (Royal Academy of Arts Collections)

1506 works
Sculptures by Michelangelo
Sculptures in London
Nude art
Marble sculptures in the United Kingdom
Royal Academy
16th-century sculptures
Statues of the Madonna and Child
Sculptures depicting John the Baptist
Nude sculptures
Sculptures of children in the United Kingdom